Anheteromeyenia is a genus of freshwater sponge. It has been recorded in the Nearctic, the Neotropics. This taxon was initially a subgenus of Heteromeyenia when K. Schöder circumscribed it in 1927, but W. M. de Laubenfels made it a genus in its own right in 1936.

, WoRMS recognizes the following species:
 Anheteromeyenia argyrosperma 
 Anheteromeyenia cheguevarai 
 Anheteromeyenia diamantina 
 Anheteromeyenia ornata 
 Anheteromeyenia vitrea

References

Further reading